Bleed. Scream. Beat! (Spanish: Sangra. Grita. Late!) is a 2017 Peruvian anthology thriller drama film directed by Aldo Miyashiro and written by Miyashiro, Erika Villalobos & Abril Cárdenas. It stars Erika Villalobos, Kareen Spano, Manuel Calderón, Rómulo Assereto, Óscar Carrillo, Iván Chávez, Andrea Luna, Bruno Espejo, Fernando Castañeda & Katya Konychev. The film won the Audience Award at the Houston Latino Film Festival.

Synopsis 
Ten actors star in three distinct stories, portraying a different character in each one of them; a man hurt by bullying, two women involved in an unexpected crime and the young woman who needs a heart to survive. This is his way of revealing us to a wild, chaotic and tender Lima at the same time. The game with photography and the change of atmosphere will be our main allies in this dizzying and thrilling journey.

Cast 
The actors participating in this film are:

 Erika Villalobos
 Kareen Spano
 Manuel Calderón
 Rómulo Assereto
 Óscar Carrillo
 Iván Chávez
 Andrea Luna
 Bruno Espejo
 Fernando Castañeda
 Katya Konychev

Release 
It premiered in October 2017 as part of the Official Competition in the Austin Film Festival. It premiered in Peruvian theaters on August 26, 2018

References

External links 

 

2017 films
2017 thriller drama films
2017 crime drama films
Peruvian crime drama films
Peruvian anthology films
Peruvian thriller drama films
2010s Peruvian films
2000s Spanish-language films
Films set in Peru
Films shot in Peru
Films about bullying
Films about criminals
Films about father–daughter relationships